Pekka Karppinen, professionally known as Kuningas Pähkinä, is a Finnish rapper born in Vaasa, Finland.

Career 

Karppinen's career had its beginning in the early 1990s when he was still living in Jyväskylä. Heavily inspired by groups like Public Enemy and House of Pain, he formed a duo Vapaapudotus with Myyrä in 2000. Together they have released four EPs. Karppinen has also released two solo records and one record with rapper Juhani. In January 2011, Kuningas Pähkinä and Kilari Audio released an EP Musaa (Kadonneet kovalevyt osa II).

Kuningas Pähkinä & Setä Tamu
Since 2000, Kuningas Pähkinä has been collaborating with rapper Setä Tamu. As a duo, they have released one album, three EPs and two singles. To date, their most successful effort together is the single "Hey Scully", which peaked at number two on the Official Finnish Singles Chart on 1 February 2013.

Yön Polte
Kuningas Pähkinä, Setä Tamu and Stig joined forces in 2012 as the group Yön Polte and with the single "Tyttö sinä olet meritähti". The song peaked at number seven on the Finnish Singles Chart.

Discography

Vapaapudotus
Albums
2000: Paholaismusiikkia
2001: Kun te nukutte
2002: Teidän kaupunkiin 
2003; Kokeile uudestaan

TKK & Juhani
Albums

Kuningas Pähkinä & Setä Tamu
Albums

EPs

Singles

Kuningas Pähkinä & Kilari Audio
EPs

Yön Polte
Singles

References

Living people
Finnish rappers
Year of birth missing (living people)